Dare Ajiboye is an author and the chief executive officer and the general secretary of the Bible Society of Nigeria.

Publications 

 Succession planning basics in faith-based and secular organisations

References

Living people
Nigerian chief executives
Year of birth missing (living people)